The American Distilling Institute (ADI), is the major trade association for the craft / micro distillery industry in the United States representing over 2000 licensed craft distilleries operating in the United States.

History 
The American Distilling Institute was the United States' first association for the craft distillery industry since prohibition. It was founded in 2003 when there were only ~60 distilleries as state regulations in the United States eased and began to allow small distilleries to operate again. Prior to prohibition there were over 2000 local distilleries. However, after prohibition was lifted, careful management of government regulation (the three tier system) by the largest distilleries and wholesalers to minimize competition blocked most distilleries from reopening.

Membership 
ADI's membership comprises mainly small and mid-sized distilleries.

Annual conference 
The first conference was held in 2004 at St. George Distillery in Alameda, CA.

Craft spirits judging 
The American Distilling Institute has held its annual Judging of Craft Spirits since 2007 and is the oldest and largest craft spirits competition. Distillers from all over the world submit entries which are blind tasted and evaluated by experts in the Spirits industry. All entries are scored and feedback is provided on all entries. ADI Judging results are announced at the annual Awards Gala.

Craft spirits awards 
Distillers compete for medals at the ADI Judging, and the recipients of medals are announced at the annual Gala. The Gala concludes with the announcement of the Distillery of the Year Award called "Bubble Cap" award (a reference to a distilling device called a bubble cap).

Awards:

Best of Category

Best of Class

Excellence in Packaging Awards: awarded to a gold medal bottle

Bronze, Silver, Gold and Double Gold Medals

Bubble Cap Awards: Awarded to Distillery of the Year

2020 Bubble Cap Award 
 Distillery of the Year – Spirit Works Distillery

2019 Bubble Cap Award 
 Distillery of the Year – Golden Moon Distillery

2018 Bubble Cap Awards 
 Distillery of the Year – Copperworks Distilling, Founders Micah Nutt and Jason Parker.
 Lifetime Achievement Award – Hubert Germain-Robin, Master Distiller, Master Blender & Spirits Consultant
 Best Farm Distillery – Sourland Mountain Spirits, Founder Ray Disch
 Best Distillery Experience – Lost Spirits, Founder Bryan Davis
2017 Bubble Cap Award
 Distillery of the Year – Cedar Ridge Winery and Distillery
2016 Bubble Cap Award
 Distillery of the Year – Kings County Distillery

Annual craft distillery directory 
Every year the Distiller's Resource Directory is published and distributed at the annual conference. The directory contains two primary sections. The first section is a listing of every active craft distillery. The second section is good and services needed to own and operate a craft distillery.

Distiller Magazine 
A trade magazine focusing on news, research, and education in the craft distilling industry.

References

2003 establishments in the United States
Distilleries in the United States
Trade associations based in the United States
Organizations established in 2003